A concrete mixer (often colloquially called a cement mixer) is a device that homogeneously combines cement, aggregate such as sand or gravel, and water to form concrete. A typical concrete mixer uses a revolving drum to mix the components. For smaller volume works, portable concrete mixers are often used so that the concrete can be made at the construction site, giving the workers ample time to use the concrete before it hardens. An alternative to a machine is mixing concrete by hand. This is usually done in a wheelbarrow; however, several companies have recently begun to sell modified tarps for this purpose.

The concrete mixer was invented by Columbus, Ohio industrialist Gebhardt Jaeger.

History

One of the first concrete mixers ever was developed in 1900 by T.L. Smith in Milwaukee. The mixer already exhibited the still common basic construction with a tiltable conical drum (as double cone at that time) with blades. 1925, at least two mixers, built 25 years ago, were still in use (serial numbers 37 and 82). The Smith Mascot in essence has the same construction of the small mixers used today. In the 1920s, the T.L. Smith Company in Milwaukee built the world's largest concrete mixers. Mixers of this company were used e. g. for the construction of the Wilson Dam (six 2-yard and two 4-yard mixers, at the time the largest single installation of the largest concrete mixers in the world), the first stadium of the Ohio State University and the Exchequer Dam.

Industrial mixers

Today's market increasingly requires consistent homogeneity and short mixing times for the industrial production of ready-mix concrete, and more so for precast/prestressed concrete. This has resulted in refinement of mixing technologies for concrete production. Different styles of stationary mixers have been developed, each with its own inherent strengths targeting different parts of the concrete production market. The most common mixers used today fall into three categories:

Twin-shaft mixers, known for their high intensity mixing, and short mixing times.
Vertical axis mixers, most commonly used for precast and prestressed concrete. This style of mixer cleans well between batches, and is favoured for coloured concrete, smaller batches (typically ), and multiple discharge points. Within this category, the pan mixers are losing popularity to the more efficient planetary (or counter-current) mixers, as the additional mixing action helps in production of more critical concrete mixes (colour consistency, SCC, etc.).
Drum mixers (reversing drum mixer and tilting drum mixers), used where large volumes (batch sizes of ) are being produced. This type of mixer is capable of high production outputs.

All the mixer styles have their own inherent strengths and weaknesses, and all are used throughout the world to varying degrees of popularity.

Trucks and trailers

Concrete mixing transport trucks

Special concrete transport trucks (in-transit mixers) are made to mix concrete and transport it to the construction site. They can be charged with dry materials and water, with the mixing occurring during transport. They can also be loaded from a "central mix" plant; with this process the material has already been mixed prior to loading. The concrete mixing transport truck maintains the material's liquid state through agitation, or turning of the drum, until delivery. These trucks have an interior turbine that pushes the mixed concrete up against gravity inside the drum. The interior of the drum on a concrete mixing truck is fitted with a spiral blade. In one rotational direction, the concrete is pushed deeper into the drum. This is the direction the drum is rotated while the concrete is being transported to the building site. This is known as "charging" the mixer. When the drum rotates in the other direction, the Archimedes' screw-type arrangement "discharges", or forces the concrete out of the drum. From there it may go onto chutes to guide the viscous concrete directly to the job site. If the truck cannot get close enough to the site to use the chutes, the concrete may be discharged into a concrete pump, connected to a flexible hose, or onto a conveyor belt which can be extended some distance (typically ten or more metres). A pump provides the means to move the material to precise locations, multi-floor buildings, and other distance-prohibitive locations. Buckets suspended from cranes are also used to place the concrete.
The drum is traditionally made of steel but on some newer trucks, fibreglass has been used as a weight reduction measure.

"Rear discharge" trucks require both a driver and a "chuteman" to guide the truck and chute back and forth to place concrete in the manner suitable to the contractor. Newer "front discharge" trucks have controls inside the cab of the truck to allow the driver to move the chute in all directions. The first front discharge mixer, patented in 1974, was designed and built by Royal W. Sims of Holladay, Utah, United States.

Concrete mixers are equipped with two or more axles. Four-, five- and six-axle trucks are the most common, with the number being determined by the load and local legislation governing allowable loads on the road.

The axles are necessary to distribute the load evenly, allow operation on weight restricted roads, and reduce wear and tear on normal roads. A two- or three-axle truck during the winter when road weight limits are reduced has no usable payload in many jurisdictions. Other areas may require expensive permits to operate.

Additional axles other than those used for steering ("steers") or drivetrain ("drives") may be installed between the steers and drives, or behind the drives. Mixers commonly have multiple steering axles as well, which generally result in very large turning radii. To facilitate maneuvering, the additional axles may be "lift axles", which allows them to be raised off the ground so that they do not scrub (get dragged sideways across the ground) on tight turns, or increase the vehicle's turning radius. Axles installed behind the drives are known as "tag axles" or "booster axles", and are often equipped to turn opposite to the steering axle to reduce scrubbing and automatically lift when the truck is put into a reverse gear.

Tractor trailer combination mixers where the mixer is installed on a trailer instead of a truck chassis are used in some jurisdictions, such as the province of Quebec where even six-axle trucks would have trouble carrying a useful load.

Concrete mixers generally do not travel far from their plant, as the concrete begins to set as soon as it is in the truck. Many contractors require that the concrete be in place within 90 minutes after loading. If the truck breaks down or for some other reason the concrete hardens in the truck, workers may need to enter the barrel with jackhammers.

Stephen Stepanian filed a patent application for the first truck mixer in 1916.

Concrete mixer trailers

A variant of standard concrete transportation is the concrete or cement mixing trailer. These small versions of transit-mix trucks are used to supply short loads of concrete. Cart-aways are usually pulled behind a pick-up truck and batched from smaller batching systems. The mixing trailer system is popular with rental yards and building material locations, which use them to supply ready-mix to their regular customer base.

Metered concrete trucks

Metered concrete trucks or volumetric mobile mixers contain concrete ingredient materials and water to be mixed on the truck at the job site to make and deliver concrete according to the amount needed.

On-site and portable concrete mixers

For smaller jobs, such as residential repairs, renovations, or hobbyist-scale projects, many cubic yards of concrete are usually not required. Bagged cement is readily available in small-batch sizes, and aggregate and water are easily obtained in small quantities for the small work site. To service this small-batch concrete market, many types of small portable concrete mixers are available.

A typical portable concrete mixer uses a small revolving drum to mix the components. For smaller jobs the concrete made at the construction site has no time lost in transport, giving the workers ample time to use the concrete before it hardens.

Portable concrete mixers may be powered by gasoline engines, although it is more common that they are powered by electric motors using standard mains current.

These concrete mixers are further divided based on their loading mechanism. Cement, sand and other aggregates are loaded in a hydraulically operated hopper and then poured into the mixing drum for final mixing. They can be unloaded by tilting the drum. In hand-feed concrete mixers, cement, sand and other aggregates are directly added to the mixing drum manually. Both of these types of concrete mixers are popular in construction activities in Africa, some Middle Eastern countries and in the Indian subcontinent.

Self-loading concrete mixers

Self-loading concrete mixers are unique machines designed to batch, mix and transport concrete. They consist of a rotating drum mounted on an operator-driven cab-mounted chassis frame fitted with a loading bucket.

The operator of the self-loading concrete mixers batches and introduces the ingredients required for mixing concrete (cement, stone aggregates etc.) into the drum using the loading bucket. The drum is usually reversible type, tilt type or a combination of both. A predetermined volume of water is discharged to the drum via a water dispensing unit. The mixture is rotated at mixing speeds within the drum until the concrete discharges via a fitted chute.

Self-loading concrete mixers are suited for construction sites where concrete batching plants are unavailable, underfoot conditions are not suited for concrete transit mixer trucks or labor availability is scarce or constrained. Applications include urban and rural construction, concrete pavement maintenance, bridge and tunnel construction, township-level highways construction, foundation construction, national defense facilities, construction of high-speed railways, etc.

Operating code 
Operating concrete mixers correctly is one of the biggest safety issues in construction zones. Workers whose tasks are related to concrete processing currently number more than 250,000. Over 10 percent of those workers, 28,000, experienced a job-related injury or illness, and 42 died in just one year.

In fiction and culture
 In Thomas and Friends, Patrick is a concrete mixer who is dark brown and cream.
 In Bob the Builder, Dizzy is an orange on-site and portable concrete mixer and Tumbler is a yellow and green concrete transport truck (commonly called a cement truck). In the reboot of the series, Two-Tonne has a concrete mixer trailer.
 In the Transformers franchise, the Constructicon Mixmaster is a robot that can turn into a cement truck.
 The Cement Truck is a gothic sculpture by Wim Delvoye.
 Cement Mixer (Put-Ti-Put-Ti) a song by Slim Gaillard that was inspired by the sound of a concrete mixer.
 In Construction Site Maxine is a dusty brown and cream cement mixer.

Television 
 On an episode of MythBusters, experiments were done to see if dynamite can be used to clean out hardened concrete from inside of a mixer truck, with limited practical results. For the finale, an excessive amount of explosive (800 lbs of commercial blasting agent) was used, and was detonated from a long distance away. The explosion left a very clear crater, and only the engine block was recovered.
 On an episode of Wrecked - Life In The Crash Lane, O'Hare Towing responds to a call on a construction site to recover a mixer truck that had become stuck in mud, continuing to sink and threatening to roll over. After several unsuccessful attempts to hoist the mixer using a heavy rotator wrecker, the foreman informs the wrecker driver that the mixing drum contains approximately 5 cubic yards of concrete, and asks whether emptying the drum would lighten the truck enough to enable the wrecker to recover it. After emptying the drum, the wrecker operator is able to winch the mixer truck out of the mud onto solid ground.
 In season 5, episode 1 of TV series MacGyver, the series' main character uses an engine from a small portable gasoline powered concrete mixer, in order to build an aeroplane.
 Magicians Penn & Teller perform a trick called "The Psychic Cement Mixer of Death" in which Teller is strapped blindfolded inside an empty, spinning concrete mixer and picks one half of a signed, broken brick (much like other tricks that tear a card or dollar bill in half) from dozens of other bricks spinning in the mixer.
 On the 6th episode of the 13th season of Taskmaster the contestants were asked to "Use the cement mixer for something other than mixing cement." The task followed "Best use of a cement mixer other than mixing cement wins." Ardal O'Hanlon used the mixer to wash a mannequin's hair. He received one point. Bridget Christie used it as a musical instrument, to accompany a chant she made about the environment. She received 2 points. Chris Ramsey used the cement mixer to make a sausage arena, with the aim to eat the sausage on their coloured stick in the cement mixer. He received 5 points. Judi Love used the cement mixer to make a cocktail for Alex called "Love Juice". She received 3 points. Sophie Duker used the cement mixer as a tombola, containing various ice breakers for her and Alex Horne. She received 1 point.

See also
Mixing paddle
Types of concrete
Concrete plant

References

Concrete
Industrial equipment
Engineering vehicles
Trucks
Masonry
Pavements
Construction equipment